Pseudohyaleucerea bartschi is a moth in the subfamily Arctiinae. It was described by Schaus in 1928. It is found on the Bahamas.

References

Natural History Museum Lepidoptera generic names catalog

Moths described in 1928
Euchromiina